María Rosa Yorio (born August 28, 1954 in Buenos Aires) is an Argentine painter, singer, songwriter, instructor and band leader.

Early work 
Born in Buenos Aires, Argentina; María Rosa started doing vocals with legendary band Sui Generis and gained recognition as a leading female singer of PorSuiGieco. She rose to fame with Los Desconocidos de Siempre along with band leader Nito Mestre. Later on Yorio started a solo career in the late 70's recording 5 albums on the 80's.

80’s and 90’s activity 
On her debut album "Con los ojos cerrados" (1980), she was supported with recognized musicians such as Charly Garcia, Juan Carlos "Mono Fontana, Nito Mestre, David Lebón, Alejandro Lerner and María Gabriela Epumer among others.
Yorio's second album was produced by Miguel Mateos and in 1983 she released a children's LP. She returned to classic folk with "Por la vida" (1984) turning to pop sound on "Puertos" (1986), adopting "Yorio" as her only stage name.

Career 
 1972-1975: Sui Generis Vocals.
 1974-1976: PorSuiGieco.
 1977-1979: Los Desconocidos de Siempre.
 1980 to present: Solo Career.

Discography

With Porsuigieco
 Porsuigieco (1976)

With Nito Mestre y los Desconocidos de Siempre
 Nito Mestre y los Desconocidos de Siempre (1977)
 Los Desconocidos de Siempre II (1978)
 Saltaba sobre las Nubes (1979)

Solo albums
 Con los Ojos Cerrados (1980)
 Mandando todo a Singapur (1982)
 El disco de los chicos enamorados (1983)
 Por la vida (1984)
 Puertos (1986)
 Rodillas (1987)
 Asesina serial (2002)

External links 

 Biografia de María Rosa Yorio - Rock.com.ar, María Rosa Yorio Biography. 
  p. 34. Volume 153 of Leer y crear. . full text at Google Books.

Living people
1954 births
20th-century Argentine women artists
20th-century Argentine artists
21st-century Argentine women artists
20th-century Argentine women singers
Argentine women singer-songwriters
Singers from Buenos Aires
Argentine women painters
Argentine painters
Artists from Buenos Aires